The 2013 Championship League was a professional non-ranking snooker tournament that was played from 7 January to 21 March 2013 at the Crondon Park Golf Club in Stock, England.

Ding Junhui was the defending champion. but he lost 0–3 against Martin Gould in the semi-finals of the winners group.

Gould won his fourth professional title by defeating Ali Carter 3–2 in the final, and earned a place at the 2013 Champion of Champions.

Prize fund
The breakdown of prize money for this year is shown below:

Group 1–7
Winner: £3,000
Runner-up: £2,000
Semi-final: £1,000
Frame-win (league stage): £100
Frame-win (play-offs): £300
Highest break: £500
Winners group
Winner: £10,000
Runner-up: £5,000
Semi-final: £3,000
Frame-win (league stage): £200
Frame-win (play-offs): £300
Highest break: £1,000

Tournament total: £177,200

Group one
Group one matches were played on 7 and 8 January 2013. John Higgins was the first player to qualify for the winners group.

Matches

Judd Trump 1–3 John Higgins
Shaun Murphy 0–3 Ali Carter
Matthew Stevens 3–2 Mark Davis
Martin Gould 3–0 Judd Trump
John Higgins 3–0 Shaun Murphy
Ali Carter 3–0 Matthew Stevens
Mark Davis 3–0 Martin Gould
Judd Trump 3–0 Shaun Murphy
John Higgins 3–2 Ali Carter
Matthew Stevens 0–3 Martin Gould
Shaun Murphy 3–2 Martin Gould
Mark Davis 3–0 Ali Carter
Judd Trump 3–1 Mark Davis
John Higgins 3–2 Matthew Stevens
Ali Carter 2–3 Martin Gould
Shaun Murphy 2–3 Mark Davis
John Higgins 3–1 Martin Gould
Judd Trump 3–2 Matthew Stevens
Shaun Murphy 3–0 Matthew Stevens
John Higgins 0–3 Mark Davis
Judd Trump 0–3 Ali Carter

Table

Play-offs

Group two
Group two matches were played on 9 and 10 January 2013. Ali Carter was the second player to qualify for the winners group.

Matches

Ali Carter 3–0 Mark Davis
Martin Gould 3–2 Judd Trump
Stephen Maguire 1–3 Neil Robertson
Stuart Bingham 0–3 Ali Carter
Mark Davis 2–3 Martin Gould
Judd Trump 1–3 Stephen Maguire
Neil Robertson 3–0 Stuart Bingham
Ali Carter 3–2 Martin Gould
Mark Davis 2–3 Judd Trump
Stephen Maguire 1–3 Stuart Bingham
Martin Gould 0–3 Stuart Bingham
Neil Robertson 3–1 Judd Trump
Ali Carter 3–2 Neil Robertson
Mark Davis 0–3 Stephen Maguire
Judd Trump 3–2 Stuart Bingham
Martin Gould 3–1 Neil Robertson
Mark Davis 3–1 Stuart Bingham
Ali Carter 2–3 Stephen Maguire
Martin Gould 3–0 Stephen Maguire
Mark Davis 3–1 Neil RobertsonAli Carter 3–2 Judd Trump

Table

 Play-offs 

Group three
Group three matches were played on 21 and 22 January 2013. Ding Junhui was the third player to qualify for the winners group.

Matches

Martin Gould 2–3 Neil RobertsonStephen Maguire 3–2 Judd TrumpMark Selby 3–1 Mark WilliamsDing Junhui 3–1 Martin Gould
Neil Robertson 0–3 Stephen MaguireJudd Trump 1–3 Mark SelbyMark Williams 0–3 Ding JunhuiMartin Gould 2–3 Stephen MaguireNeil Robertson 2–3 Judd TrumpMark Selby 3–1 Ding JunhuiStephen Maguire 3–1 Ding JunhuiMark Williams 3–1 Judd TrumpJudd Trump 3–0 Ding Junhui
Stephen Maguire 1–3 Mark WilliamsMartin Gould 3–1 Mark Williams
Neil Robertson 1–3 Mark SelbyNeil Robertson 1–3 Ding JunhuiMartin Gould 3–2 Mark SelbyStephen Maguire 3–1 Mark SelbyNeil Robertson 3–1 Mark Williams
Martin Gould 0–3 Judd TrumpTable

 Play-offs 

Group four
Group four matches were played on 23 and 24 January 2013. Mark Allen was the fourth player to qualify for the winners group.

Matches

Judd Trump 2–3 Stephen MaguireMark Selby 0–3 Martin GouldRicky Walden 1–3 Mark AllenBarry Hawkins 1–3 Judd TrumpStephen Maguire 0–3 Mark SelbyMartin Gould 0–3 Ricky WaldenMark Allen 3–1 Barry HawkinsJudd Trump 3–1 Mark SelbyStephen Maguire 3–0 Martin Gould
Ricky Walden 1–3 Barry HawkinsMark Selby 3–2 Barry HawkinsMark Allen 3–0 Martin Gould
Judd Trump 0–3 Mark AllenStephen Maguire 3–0 Ricky WaldenMartin Gould 3–2 Barry Hawkins
Mark Selby 0–3 Mark AllenStephen Maguire 2–3 Barry HawkinsJudd Trump 2–3 Ricky WaldenMark Selby 2–3 Ricky WaldenStephen Maguire 1–3 Mark AllenJudd Trump 1–3 Martin GouldTable

 Play-offs 

Group five
Group five matches were played on 4 and 5 February 2013. Martin Gould was the fifth player to qualify for the winners group.

MatchesStephen Maguire 3–0 Ricky Walden
Martin Gould 0–3 Barry HawkinsJoe Perry 3–2 Peter Ebdon
Ryan Day 0–3 Stephen MaguireRicky Walden 3–1 Martin Gould
Barry Hawkins 1–3 Joe PerryPeter Ebdon 1–3 Ryan DayStephen Maguire 3–2 Martin Gould
Ricky Walden 1–3 Barry HawkinsJoe Perry 1–3 Ryan DayMartin Gould 3–0 Ryan Day
Peter Ebdon 0–3 Barry HawkinsStephen Maguire 3–0 Peter EbdonRicky Walden 3–1 Joe PerryBarry Hawkins 3–1 Ryan DayMartin Gould 3–1 Peter Ebdon
Ricky Walden 1–3 Ryan DayStephen Maguire 3–2 Joe PerryMartin Gould 3–2 Joe PerryRicky Walden 3–0 Peter Ebdon
Stephen Maguire 2–3 Barry HawkinsTable

 Play-offs 

Group six
Group six matches were played on 6 and 7 February 2013. Barry Hawkins was the sixth player to qualify for the winners group.

Matches

Stephen Maguire 0–3 Barry HawkinsRicky Walden 1–3 Ryan DayMarcus Campbell 2–3 Marco FuDominic Dale 3–1 Stephen Maguire
Barry Hawkins 1–3 Ricky WaldenRyan Day 3–1 Marcus Campbell
Marco Fu 2–3 Dominic DaleStephen Maguire 3–0 Ricky WaldenBarry Hawkins 3–0 Ryan DayMarcus Campbell 3–0 Dominic DaleRicky Walden 3–2 Dominic Dale
Marco Fu 1–3 Ryan DayStephen Maguire 3–2 Marco FuBarry Hawkins 3–0 Marcus Campbell
Ryan Day 1–3 Dominic DaleRicky Walden 0–3 Marco FuBarry Hawkins 3–1 Dominic DaleStephen Maguire 3–1 Marcus CampbellRicky Walden 3–0 Marcus Campbell
Barry Hawkins 1–3 Marco FuStephen Maguire 3–2 Ryan Day

Table

 Play-offs 

Group seven
Group seven matches were played on 18 and 19 March 2013. Marco Fu was the last player to qualify for the winners group.

MatchesStephen Maguire 3–0 Marco Fu
Ryan Day 2–3 Dominic DaleAndrew Higginson 3–0 Tom FordRobert Milkins 3–1 Stephen MaguireMarco Fu 3–1 Ryan Day
Dominic Dale 2–3 Andrew HigginsonTom Ford 0–3 Robert MilkinsStephen Maguire 3–0 Ryan DayMarco Fu 3–1 Dominic Dale
Andrew Higginson 1–3 Robert MilkinsRyan Day 3–0 Robert Milkins
Tom Ford 1–3 Dominic DaleStephen Maguire 2–3 Tom FordMarco Fu 3–2 Andrew HigginsonDominic Dale 3–2 Robert Milkins
Ryan Day 2–3 Tom FordMarco Fu 3–1 Robert MilkinsStephen Maguire 3–2 Andrew Higginson
Ryan Day 2–3 Andrew HigginsonMarco Fu 3–1 Tom FordStephen Maguire 3–0 Dominic Dale

Table

 Play-offs 

Winners group
The matches of the winners group were played on 20 and 21 March 2013. Martin Gould won his first Championship League title.

Matches

John Higgins 1–3 Ali CarterDing Junhui 3–1 Mark Allen
Martin Gould 2–3 Barry HawkinsMarco Fu 0–3 John HigginsAli Carter 3–1 Ding Junhui
Mark Allen 0–3 Martin GouldBarry Hawkins 0–3 Marco FuJohn Higgins 1–3 Ding JunhuiAli Carter 2–3 Mark AllenMartin Gould 2–3 Marco FuDing Junhui 3–2 Marco Fu
Barry Hawkins 1–3 Mark AllenJohn Higgins 0–3 Barry HawkinsAli Carter 0–3 Martin GouldMark Allen 0–3 Marco FuDing Junhui 3–2 Barry HawkinsAli Carter 3–1 Marco FuJohn Higgins 3–0 Martin Gould
Ding Junhui 1–3 Martin GouldAli Carter 3–0 Barry Hawkins
John Higgins 1–3 Mark AllenTable

 Play-offs 

 Century breaks 
Total: 89

 146 (4), 128, 118, 109, 109, 109, 109, 103  Stephen Maguire
 143 (W), 141, 139, 134, 128, 122, 120, 103, 101  Ding Junhui
 140 (7), 137, 134, 130, 129, 112, 107, 103, 101  Marco Fu
 140, 137 (3), 132, 122, 103  Mark Selby
 140 (1), 117, 112, 103, 102, 102  Ali Carter
 139 (5), 139, 137 (3), 133 (2), 125, 119, 113, 101, 100, 100, 100  Martin Gould
 137 (3), 136, 122, 113, 112, 110  Judd Trump
 137 (6), 133, 104, 101  Ryan Day
 133''' (2), 114, 113, 109  Neil Robertson
 133, 102  Joe Perry
 131, 126, 103, 102  John Higgins
 130, 127, 114, 107  Ricky Walden
 130, 118, 114, 104, 101  Shaun Murphy
 129, 124, 119, 105, 100  Barry Hawkins
 129  Andrew Higginson
 126, 125, 113, 109, 109, 106, 100  Mark Allen
 122  Stuart Bingham
 107  Mark Davis
 102  Matthew Stevens

Bold: highest break in the indicated group.

Winnings 

Green: Won the group. Bold: Highest break in the group. All prize money in GBP.

References

External links
 

2013
Championship League
Championship League